Ziften was a cybersecurity software company based in Austin, Texas, United States. The organization's endpoint protection platform is designed to provide advanced anti-virus, endpoint detection and response, and endpoint visibility and hardening for enterprise laptops, desktops, servers and the cloud.
As of 2020, Ziften is out of business.

History

Ziften was founded in 2009 by Mark Obrecht who previously founded WholeSecurity, a behavior-based security and anti-phishing company that sold to Symantec in 2005.

In May 2012, Ziften raised $5.5 million in capital in a Series B round from Fayez Sarofim & Co. In July 2015, Ziften raised $24 million in capital from New York-based Spring Mountain Capital LP and Fayez Sarofim & Co. In April 2017, Ziften raised an additional $14.7M from Trousdale Ventures. The organization's total funding to date is $50M.

Mike Hamilton, previously Ziften's chief product officer, was appointed CEO in June 2018.

Product and Services

In September 2017, Ziften announced a series of managed security services, called Managed Assess Service, Managed Hunt Service, and Managed Respond Service, all designed to help organizations augment their security teams by getting additional help in monitoring EDR, analytics, and security forensics.

In November 2017, Microsoft announced new partnerships for its Windows Defender Advanced Threat Protection (ATP) service, including integration with Ziften's Zenith security platform for macOS and Linux operating system support. The integration provides security events from onboarded macOS and Linux devices and surfaces them all within the Windows Defender ATP console. Ziften was later included as a member in the initial formation of the Microsoft Intelligent Security Association.

In August 2018, Ziften enhanced its Zenith endpoint protection platform with advanced anti-virus capabilities. The new capabilities help to block file-based, file-less, and in-memory attacks. Zenith uses artificial intelligence (AI) and the cloud to help protect enterprises.

References

External links 
Ziften's Website

Companies based in Austin, Texas
Computer security software companies
Antivirus software
Computer security companies
Software companies established in 2009
Security companies of the United States
2009 establishments in Texas
2020 disestablishments in Texas
Software companies disestablished in 2020
Defunct software companies of the United States
Defunct companies based in Texas